James M. Clow (26 May 1790 – 15 March 1861) was a Presbyterian minister, in the area which now consists of the outer-eastern suburbs of Melbourne, Australia.

Early life and education
James Clow was born at Ardoch on 26 May 1790. He educated  at  University  of  St  Andrews. He was licensed to preach by the Presbytery of  Kirkcaldy on 21 July 1813, He was subsequently appointed chaplain  at  Bombay  by  the  Court  of 
Directors  H.E.I.C. on 8 December 1814, and  ordained (by  Presb.  of  Kirkcaldy) on 5 April 1815.

Work in Bombay
He  arrived  in  Bombay on  8 November 1815, and on  15 December attended  a  meeting  called  by the Government  to  select  a  site  and  consider plans  for  a  church. He held  his  first  meeting of  kirk-session  11  February  1816. Clow returned  to 
Scotland  on  account  of  ill-health  on October  1817.

Work in Melbourne
He returned to Scotland in 1833 and then headed to Hobart, Australia, in 1837. On Christmas Day 1837, he and his large family arrived in Melbourne.

He conducted the first Church of Scotland service in the Port Phillip District on 31 December. In Melbourne he purchased  of land on Swanston Street. The family initially lived in tents till he could have erected on the land a pre-fabricated house he brought with him from Hobart.

The Aboriginals often visited he and his family at their homestead.

He sold the lease to John Wood Beilby in 1850. Tirhartruan was located on the north side of Wellington Road, just east of Dandenong Creek, and was the subject of an archaeological dig in the 1970s. The electoral ward of Tirhartruan in the City of Knox is named after Clow's homestead.

Clow was  elected  first  Moderator  of  the General  Assembly  of  the  Presbyterian Church  of  Victoria  on 7  April  1859. He  died on 15 March 1861,  Father  of  the  Church  in  Victoria.

Family
He  married  13  April  1819, Margaret  Morison,  and  had  issue —
James Maxwell,  born  13  January  1820
Mary Elizabeth,  born  27  June  1821,  died  a child
Helen  Johanna,  born  24  October 1822
Margaret  Jessie,  born  28  January 1824
Mary  Elizabeth,  born  1  March 1825
Jane,  born  3  and  died  8 July 1828
Jane,  born  4  March  1830
Henry Monereiff,  born  30  March  1832,  and another  daughter  His  five  daughters  (identifications unknown)  married Archibald Campbell  of  the  Murray,  Dr  Robertson, Queenscliff  and  Kew,  James  Forbes,  minister of  the  Scots  Church,  Melbourne,  William Hamilton,  minister  at  Mortlake,  and  Dr  Wilkie, Melbourne.

References

Citations

Sources

Johnston, William (1899).  Some Account of the Last Bajans of King's and Marischal Colleges. Edinburgh: Adelphi.
(1869). "Presbyterianism in Victoria and Otago and Southland." The Reformed Presbyterian magazine. July 1.
(1911). The New Schaff-Herzog Encyclopedia of Knowledge. Edinburgh: Johnstone.

1790 births
Settlers of Melbourne
British chaplains
History of Victoria (Australia)
British Presbyterians
Australian Presbyterians
1861 deaths